Marc Carol Joseph Dufour (September 11, 1941 – January 23, 2015) was a Canadian ice hockey player. He played the majority of his career in the American Hockey League, for the Springfield Kings and Baltimore Clippers.  Dufour played in fourteen National Hockey League games, two with the Los Angeles Kings and twelve with the New York Rangers. He died in January 2015, aged 73.

Awards and achievements
MJHL Goal Scoring Leader (1962) 
Turnbull Cup MJHL Championship (1962)

References

External links
 

1941 births
2015 deaths
Baltimore Clippers players
Brandon Wheat Kings players
Canadian ice hockey right wingers
Edmonton Oil Kings (WCHL) players
Guelph Royals players
Ice hockey people from Quebec
Los Angeles Blades (WHL) players
Los Angeles Kings players
New York Rangers players
Sportspeople from Trois-Rivières
Springfield Kings players
St. Paul Rangers players
Vancouver Canucks (WHL) players